is an indoor arena located in Hiroshima, Japan. The original arena was built sometime shortly after World War II. The arena was rebuilt for the 1994 Asian Games. It hosted some of the group games for the 2006 FIVB Men's World Championship and the official 2006 Basketball World Championship.

Facilities
Main Arena
Sub Arena
Budō arena - for judo and kendo
Kyūdō arena
Fitness plaza
Training room
Swimming pool
Studio
Health Support Center
Conference rooms
Sports Information Center
Mizuno pro shop
Restaurant
Shop

Access
Hiroshima Bus Center
Astram Line
Hiroden Main Line and Ujina Line

External links

 

Sports venues in Hiroshima
Indoor arenas in Japan
Basketball venues in Japan
Boxing venues in Japan